= J. Warwick Moore =

Joseph Warwick Moore (21 July 1869 – 27 December 1931) was a British composer. He also published under the pseudonym Emile Gastelle.

Born in Worcester to Joseph Isiah Moore, a carpet weaver, and Mary. He worked as a musical director in theatres around England.

He married twice, firstly in 1892 to Lillian Jane née Welch, and secondly to Jennie, with whom he had four children.

Some of his compositions have been recorded by German pianist Uwe Rössler.
